Martijn Meerdink (born 15 September 1976) is a Dutch former professional footballer who most notably played for AZ Alkmaar as a winger and was capped for the Netherlands.

In January 2007, he moved from AZ to FC Groningen in a transfer worth £150,000. In July 2009, he returned to his first club, De Graafschap, but a serious injury effectively ended his professional career. He retired from professional football in March 2010.

Personal life
Meerdink’s son Mexx Meerdink plays for Jong AZ.

References

External links
 

1976 births
Living people
People from Winterswijk
Dutch footballers
Netherlands international footballers
AZ Alkmaar players
FC Groningen players
De Graafschap players
Eredivisie players
Eerste Divisie players
Association football midfielders
Footballers from Gelderland